Acute zonal occult outer retinopathy (AZOOR) is an inflammatory retinopathy in the category of white dot syndromes typified by acute loss of one or more zones of outer retinal function associated with photopsia, minimal funduscopic changes and abnormal electroretinography findings.

This retinal disease was first described by Donald Gass in 1992. Relatively little is known about the condition.

Risk factors
Caucasian females in their mid-thirties appear to be most susceptible but the disease may affect anyone regardless of age, sex or race.

Pathophysiology
The disease mechanism is unknown but it is believed that it may be caused by a virus, or an auto immune response.

References

External links 

Eye diseases